HMS Orion was a  of the Victorian Royal Navy. Originally constructed for the Ottoman Empire, and called Bourdjou-Zaffer, she was purchased by the British Government before completion.

She was designed by the Ottoman naval architect Ahmed Pasha and built by Samuda Brothers at Cubitt Town, London under contract for the Ottoman Empire. However, in 1878 she was purchased by the British Government whilst still under construction, in a reaction to the war between the Ottoman Empire and Russia. Her sister, which was purchased at the same time in an essentially complete state, was modified so as to fit in, as far as possible, with contemporary design in the Royal Navy. Orion, being less advanced in construction at the time of her purchase, was ultimately completed along the same lines.

Her original design called for four 10-inch muzzle-loading rifles in a centrally located box battery, but this plan was upgraded to four  guns during her building. She, and Belleisle were the only British ships ever to mount 12-inch calibre artillery deployed to fire only on the broadside. It was possible, because of the provision of appropriate embrasures in the battery, to bring at least one gun to bear at any angle; proponents of the turret system of armament pointed out that in the turret system two, or possibly four guns could be made to bear on the same target.

Service history
She was commissioned to the Mediterranean Fleet on 24 June 1878. After paying off into the Reserve at Malta in 1883 she was recommissioned in 1885, and served as guardship at Singapore until 1890, when she was demoted to the second class reserve at Malta. After refit and repair she remained in dockyard reserve at Chatham until declared non-effective in January 1902. Three months later, in April 1902, she became a depot-ship at Malta for torpedo-boats, Captain Charles Madden in command. In 1913 she was converted to a store-ship at Devonport under the name of Orontes until her sale in 1913.

References
 Oscar Parkes, British Battleships  
 Conway, All the World's Fighting Ships  

Belleisle-class ironclads
Ships built in Cubitt Town
1879 ships
Victorian-era battleships of the United Kingdom